David Kenneth McNamee (born 10 October 1980) is a Scottish former footballer, who played as a right back. His clubs included St Mirren, Blackburn Rovers, Livingston, Coventry City, Plymouth Argyle, Aberdeen and Ross County. McNamee represented Scotland four times at international level.

Club career
McNamee, a versatile defender, started his career with Scottish club St Mirren. His impressive performances for St Mirren alerted Premier League club Blackburn Rovers, who signed him in 1999. His £300,000 transfer to England, was unsuccessful, however. Having failed to make a single first team appearance for the Ewood Park club, McNamee returned to Scotland in 2002 to join Livingston for an undisclosed fee.

McNamee was a member of the Livingston team which won the 2004 Scottish League Cup Final, against Hibernian at Hampden Park. In 2005–06, his season was blighted by injury and he only featured 15 times for Livingston, who were eventually relegated from the Scottish Premier League.

With Livingston having been relegated from the SPL, and several clubs having confirmed their interest in him, it was unlikely that McNamee would remain at Livingston. On 2 June 2006, he signed for Coventry City of the English Championship, for a fee of £100,000. His time at the Ricoh Arena was blighted by injuries, and although given a chance to prove his worth to the team, manager Chris Coleman decided against offering a new deal. McNamee was released by Coventry on 14 July 2008. The next day, McNamee signed a two-year contract with fellow Championship club Plymouth Argyle, becoming their third signing of the summer. In May 2010, after playing nearly 20 times for Plymouth, McNamee and teammates Yoann Folly and Lloyd Saxton were released.

McNamee started training with Motherwell in November 2010, with a view of signing a permanent deal with the Steelmen. However, following manager Craig Brown's departure to Aberdeen, McNamee looked set to follow him to Pittodrie. McNamee was on his way to Aberdeen to undergo a medical when his plane from Birmingham had to turn back due to heavy snow closing Dyce Airport. McNamee eventually signed for Aberdeen on 24 December, again teaming up with Folly. On 27 April, it was announced that McNamee would not be offered a new contract at Pittodrie and would be released at the end of the season.

McNamee spent six months without a club before joining Ross County in January 2012, signing a contract until the end of the 2011–12 season.

Conference National club Nuneaton Town signed McNamee in October 2012.

International career
After an impressive season with Livingston, McNamee was handed a Scotland call-up by manager, Berti Vogts for two end-of season friendlies. He won his first cap playing 90 minutes in an exhibition match against Estonia national football team on 27 May 2004. Just three days later, McNamee won his second cap against Trinidad and Tobago national football team.

He went two years without a call-up before he was selected by Walter Smith for his Scotland squads in 2005. After a period of being an unused substitute in matches, he finally won his third cap against Bulgaria in the Kirin Cup where he came on as an 82nd-minute substitute. He won his fourth and so far final cap in the Kirin Cup against the hosts, Japan on 13 May 2006 as an 80th-minute substitute helping Scotland to winning the competition.

After playing football
After retiring from playing football in 2014, McNamee studied for coaching qualifications. He worked for the youth academy of Coventry City, but found that he did not have sufficient enthusiasm for coaching. McNamee then joined the Royal Navy. As of November 2015, he was attending HMS Raleigh to train as a mine warfare specialist.

Career statistics

A.  The "Other" column constitutes appearances (including substitutes) and goals in the 2002–03 UEFA Cup.

Honours
Livingston
Scottish League Cup (1): 2003-04

Scotland
Kirin Cup (1): 2006

References

External links

1980 births
Living people
Footballers from Glasgow
Scottish footballers
Scotland B international footballers
Scotland international footballers
Association football fullbacks
St Mirren F.C. players
Blackburn Rovers F.C. players
Livingston F.C. players
Coventry City F.C. players
Plymouth Argyle F.C. players
Aberdeen F.C. players
Ross County F.C. players
Scottish Football League players
Scottish Premier League players
English Football League players
Nuneaton Borough F.C. players
Leamington F.C. players
Coventry City F.C. non-playing staff
Royal Navy sailors